The Hong Kong International Convention for the safe and environmentally sound recycling of ships, or Hong Kong Convention is a mulitateral convention adopted in 2009, which has not entered into force. The conference that created the convention was attended by 63 countries, and overseen by the International Maritime Organization (IMO).

The convention has been designed to improve the health and safety of current ship breaking practices. Ship breaking is considered to be "amongst the most dangerous of occupations, with unacceptably high levels of fatalities, injuries and work-related diseases" by the ILO as large ships are often beached and then dismantled by hand by workers with very little personal protective equipment (PPE). This is most common in Asia, with India, Bangladesh, China, and Pakistan holding the largest ship breaking yards.

The Hong Kong Convention recognised that ship recycling is the most environmentally sound way to dispose of a ship at the end of its life, as most of the ship's materials can be reused. However, it sees current methods as unacceptable. The work sees many injuries and fatalities to workers, as they lack the correct safety equipment to handle the large ship correctly as it is dismantled and most vessels contain a large amount of hazardous materials such as asbestos, PCBs, TBT, and CFCs, which can also lead to highly life-threatening diseases such as mesothelioma and lung cancer.

In advance of ratification of the Hong Kong Convention, the Industry Working Group on Ship Recycling issued Guidelines on Transitional Measures for Shipowners Selling Ships for Recycling.

Inventory of Hazardous Materials
The Inventory of Hazardous Materials has been designed to try to minimise the dangers of these hazards. The Convention defines a hazard as: “any material or substance which is liable to create hazards to human health and/or the environment".

All vessels over 500 gross tons (GT) have to comply with the convention once it comes into force. Each party that does wish to comply must restrict the use of hazardous materials on all ships that fly the flag of that party.

New ships must all carry an Inventory of Hazardous Materials. The inventory will list all 'hazardous materials' on board the vessel, including their amounts and locations. Existing ships must comply no later than five years after the convention comes into force, or prior to being recycled if this occurs before the five-year period. The inventory will remain with a vessel throughout its lifespan, being updated as all new installations enter the ship, as these may potentially contain hazards. The presence of the inventory will then ensure the safety of crew members during the vessel's working life, and also the safety of workers during the recycling process.

Signature, ratification and accession
The convention was open for signature between 1 September 2009 and 31 August 2010, and remained open for accession afterwards. It will enter into force two years after "15 states, representing 40% of the world merchant shipping by gross tonnage, and on average 3% of recycling tonnage for the previous 10 years, have either signed it without reservation as to ratification, acceptance or approval, or have deposited instruments of ratification, acceptance, approval or accession with the Secretary General". None of these conditions was met as of 2017.

Transitional Guidelines
In advance of ratification of the Hong Kong Convention, the Industry Working Group on Ship Recycling in 2009 issued the first edition of Guidelines on Transitional Measures for Shipowners Selling Ships for Recycling. These are supported by maritime organizations: International Chamber of Shipping (ICS), the Baltic and International Maritime Council (BIMCO), the International Association of Classification Societies (IACS), Intercargo, the International Parcel Tankers Association (IPTA), Intertanko, the Oil Companies International Marine Forum (OCIMF), and the International Transport Workers' Federation (ITF). The Transitional Measures are also supported by the national shipowners' associations of Australia, Bahamas, Belgium,
Canada, Chile, Cyprus, Denmark, Faroe Islands, Finland, France, Germany, Greece, Hong Kong, India, Ireland, Italy, Japan, Korea, Kuwait, Liberia, Mexico, Netherlands, Norway, Portugal, Philippines, Russia, Singapore, Spain, Sweden, Switzerland, Turkey, United Kingdom and United States.

Relation to EU instruments
The EU Ship Recycling Regulation  entered into force on 30 December 2013. Although this regulation closely follows the Hong Kong convention, there are important differences. The Regulation sets out a number of requirements for European ships, European ship owners, ship recycling facilities willing to recycle European ships, and the relevant competent authorities or administrations. It also requires the Commission to adopt a number of acts implementing the Regulation (in particular the European List of ship recycling facilities authorized to recycle ships flying the Union flag). For the Inventory of Hazardous Materials required by the EU regulation, there are additional substances listed as prohibited.

References

Environmental conferences
Hazardous materials
2009 in Hong Kong
Treaties concluded in 2009
Treaties not entered into force
Treaties of Belgium
Treaties of the Republic of the Congo
Treaties of Croatia
Treaties of Denmark
Treaties of Estonia
Treaties of France
Treaties of Germany
Treaties of Ghana
Treaties of India
Treaties of Japan
Treaties of Malta
Treaties of the Netherlands
Treaties extended to the Caribbean Netherlands
Treaties of Norway
Treaties of Panama
Treaties of Serbia
Treaties of Turkey